MUFG Americas Holdings Corporation (formerly known as UnionBanCal Corporation) is an intermediate bank holding company based in New York City. It is the parent company of MUFG Union Bank, N.A. and MUFG's consolidated U.S. operations.

MUFG Americas Holdings (MUAH) is itself a wholly owned subsidiary of MUFG Bank, Ltd., a member of the Japanese Mitsubishi UFJ Financial Group conglomerate.

History
MUAH had total assets of $163 billion as of December 31, 2021. Its predecessor, UnionBanCal Corporation, had assets of $105 billion as of December 31, 2013. MUAH has the largest presence in the U.S. among all other Japanese Banks, as competitors Sumitomo Mitsui Financial Group and Mizuho Financial Group do not operate U.S. branch banking subsidiaries.

In 2013, bank officials stated that the bank's aim was to become the tenth largest financial operating institution in the U.S. through aggressive acquisition(s).

In May 2014, Union Bank, N.A. announced it would be changing its legal name from Union Bank N.A. to MUFG Union Bank, N.A. effective July 1, 2014. On the same effective date, UnionBanCal Corporation changed its legal name to MUFG Americas Holdings Corporation. On September 21, 2021, MUFG Union Bank, N.A. announced that it would be acquired by US Bancorp.

Shareholders
MUFG Bank — 63% in Feb. 2005, and 100% on 4 November 2008.

Sections
Community Banking and Investment Services Group
Commercial Financial Services Group
Global Markets Group
International Banking Group

Subsidiaries
 MUFG Union Bank — formerly Union Bank, N.A. and Union Bank of California, N.A.
 Tanner Insurance Brokers Inc.

Notes

References

Banks based in New York (state)
Financial services companies based in New York (state)
Holding companies of the United States
Companies based in New York City
American companies established in 1999
American companies established in 2014
Banks established in 1999
Banks established in 2014
Holding companies established in 1999
Holding companies established in 2014
1999 establishments in California
2014 establishments in New York (state)
Mitsubishi companies
Mitsubishi UFJ Financial Group